José Pinto may refer to:

 José Pinto (rugby union) (born 1981), Portuguese rugby union player
 José Pinto (racewalker) (born 1956), Portuguese retired race walker
 José Manuel Pinto (born 1975), Spanish football goalkeeper
 Ferreira Pinto (footballer, born 1939) (born 1939), former Portuguese footballer 
 Zezinho (Brazilian footballer) (born 1992), Brazilian footballer
 José Carlos Pinto (born 1993), Guatemalan footballer
 José Pinto (Honduran footballer) (born 1997),Honduran footballer